Leo Krzycki (1881-1966) was a chairman of the Socialist Party of America and vice president of the Amalgamated Clothing Workers of America.

Background
Leo C. Krzycki was born on August 10, 1881, in Milwaukee, Wisconsin, to Martin Krzycki and Katherine Wobszal.

Career
In 1918, Krzycki ran for the United States House of Representatives from Wisconsin's 8th congressional district. He lost to incumbent Edward E. Browne. In 1924, he was a candidate for the House of Representatives from Wisconsin's 4th congressional district. He lost to incumbent John C. Schafer. Krzycki ran for the United States Senate in 1926, losing to John J. Blaine. He then ran for Secretary of State of Wisconsin in 1928, losing to incumbent Theodore Dammann.

In 1933, Krzycki was elected chairman of the national executive board of the Socialist Party of America, succeeding the lately deceased Morris Hillquit.

Krzycki's 1937 involvement in the strike of about 1,500 people against the Republic Steel plant was criticized, especially the "march" forward that the strikers took towards the plant gates. One first-hand account stated that he knew beforehand that the police captain was a "sadist" and stayed on-stage, trying in vain to dissuade the protests from going forward. Krzycki was also a key figure in organizing the 1937 strike against Ford Motor Company, and shares a historic image leading the strikers with labor leaders Richard Frankensteen and Ed Hall.

Personal life and death

In 1909, Krzycki married Anna Kadau, a neighbor; they had three children.

Krzycki was a member of the American Committee for Protection of Foreign Born.

Leo Krzycki died age 84 on January 22, 1966, in Milwaukee.

Awards
 1946:  Order of Polonia Restituta

See also
 Amalgamated Clothing Workers of America
 Wisconsin Labor History Society
 Socialist Party of America
 Joseph Catalanotti (contemporary ACWA EVP)

References

External links
 Guide to the Don Binkowski Collection Of Leo Krzycki Memorabilia, held at Kheel Center for Labor-Management Documentation and Archives, Cornell University Library

Politicians from Milwaukee
Socialist Party of America politicians from Wisconsin
1881 births
1966 deaths
American people of Polish descent
American trade unionists of Polish descent